All The Blue Changes – An Anthology 1988–2003 is a double CD compilation by British Art Rock group No-Man, spanning their entire career – from the Speak sessions in 1988 up until the release of Together We're Stranger in 2003. Many songs are unreleased versions of No-Man songs.

Track listing

Notes 
The version of "Days In The Trees" which appears on "All The Blue Changes" is a different mix of the "Mahler" version which made considerable impact when released as a single – it also features a longer fadeout than the other versions. The version of "Dry Cleaning Ray" is a version of the single mix without a fade-out (running about 30 seconds longer), and "My Revenge On Seattle" is the unused alternate mix and edit made for a planned single release (before the band chose "Dry Cleaning Ray" instead). Of the rare tracks, "Walker" dates back to the 1991 sessions for "Loveblows & Lovecries" and would have featured on the initial track list for that album. "The Break Up For Real (Drum Mix)" and "(bluecoda)" both originally appeared on the limited-edition vinyl edition of "Together We're Stranger".

-Steven-

References 

No-Man albums
2006 compilation albums